Zar Deh may refer to:

Dar Deh, Tehran